"Beautiful to Me" is the first single by Australian indie rock band Little Birdy, from their debut album BigBigLove. It was released on 13 September 2004 and reached number 27 on the ARIA Singles Charts.
The song reached number 2 on the Triple J Net 50 and was ranked number 8 on Triple J's Hottest 100 of 2004.

Like all the tracks on BigBigLove, the single was produced and mixed by Paul McKercher (Eskimo Joe, Pete Murray, Augie March, You Am I). The song was written by Katy Steele.

Track listing

Charts

References

2004 singles
2004 songs
EMI Records singles
Little Birdy songs
Songs written by Katy Steele
Virgin Records singles